MV Glenartney was a Glen Line cargo twin-screw motor ship that was launched in Scotland in 1915 as Montezuma, renamed Glenartney when she changed owners, and sunk by a U-boat in 1918.

Building
Elder, Dempster & Co ordered the ship from Harland and Wolff, who built her at Irvine, North Ayrshire. She was launched in 1915 as Montezuma. While she was being fitted out, Glen Line bought her and renamed her Glenartney. She was completed in 1916.

The ship's main engines were a pair of Burmeister & Wain four-stroke single-acting diesels, probably built under licence by Harland and Wolff.

Service
On 26 August 1916 Glenartney suffered a serious fire in her holds in Singapore.

In February 1918 Glenartney was in the Mediterranean sailing from Singapore to London. Glenartney sank with the loss of two members of her crew.

References

1915 ships
1916 fires in Asia
Cargo ships of the United Kingdom
Glen Line
Maritime incidents in 1918
Ship fires
Ships built by Harland and Wolff
Ships built in Scotland
Ships sunk by German submarines in World War I
World War I merchant ships of the United Kingdom
World War I shipwrecks in the Mediterranean Sea